The 2017 BGL BNP Paribas Luxembourg Open was a women's tennis tournament played on indoor hard courts sponsored by BNP Paribas. It was the 22nd edition of the Luxembourg Open, and part of the WTA International tournaments category of the 2017 WTA Tour. It was held in Kockelscheuer, Luxembourg, on 16–21 October 2017.

Points and prize money

Point distribution

Prize money

1 Qualifiers prize money is also the Round of 32 prize money
* per team

Singles entrants

Seeds 

 Rankings as of 9 October 2017

Other entrants 
The following players received wildcards into the singles main draw:
  Angelique Kerber
  Sabine Lisicki 
  Andrea Petkovic 

The following player received entry as a special exempt:
  Mihaela Buzărnescu

The following player received entry using a protected ranking into the singles main draw:
  Ajla Tomljanović

The following players received entry from the qualifying draw:
  Jana Fett
  Pauline Parmentier 
  Alison Van Uytvanck
  Yanina Wickmayer

The following player received entry as a lucky loser:
  Naomi Broady

Withdrawals 
Before the tournament
  Océane Dodin → replaced by  Petra Martić
  Camila Giorgi → replaced by  Naomi Broady
  Magda Linette → replaced by  Jana Čepelová
  Lucie Šafářová → replaced by  Madison Brengle
  Barbora Strýcová → replaced by  Evgeniya Rodina
  Roberta Vinci → replaced by  Eugenie Bouchard
  Markéta Vondroušová → replaced by  Sara Sorribes Tormo

Retirements 
  Sorana Cîrstea
  Andrea Petkovic

Doubles entrants

Seeds 

 1 Rankings as of 9 October 2017

Other entrants
The following pair received a wildcard into the doubles main draw:
  Anna-Lena Friedsam /  Antonia Lottner

Withdrawals
Before the tournament
  Lara Arruabarrena
  Kiki Bertens

Champions

Singles 

  Carina Witthöft def.  Monica Puig, 6–3, 7–5

Doubles

  Lesley Kerkhove /  Lidziya Marozava def.  Eugenie Bouchard /  Kirsten Flipkens, 6–7(4–7), 6–4, [10–6]

External links 
 
 Women's Tennis Association (WTA) tournament profil

2017 WTA Tour
2017
2017 in Luxembourgian tennis
Luxembourg Open